Frisilia trizeugma is a moth in the family Lecithoceridae. It was described by Chun-Sheng Wu and Kyu-Tek Park in 1999. It is found in Sri Lanka.

The wingspan is 10–13 mm. The forewings are ochreous yellow, scattered with brown and with a dark brown pattern. There is a large dot in the cell and a long discocellular spot near the inner margin. The hindwings are grey to light brown.

Etymology
The species name is derived from Greek tri (meaning three) and zeugma (meaning band).

References

Moths described in 1999
Frisilia